Perchlorylbenzene (C6H5ClO3, PhClO3, is an aromatic compound prepared by direct electrophilic perchlorylation of benzene using perchloryl fluoride and aluminum trichloride:

The compound is described as a somewhat shock-sensitive oily liquid.  It exhibits low chemical reactivity and is inert towards acidic (HCl (aq.)) or reducing (LiAlH4, H2/Pd) conditions.  However, it undergoes hydrolysis upon reflux in aqueous KOH to afford phenol, and undergoes aromatic nitration to afford the meta-nitration product, as expected for a strongly –I, –M substituent.

It and its derivatives have been investigated as novel energetic materials analogous to nitro compounds.

See also 
 Electrophilic aromatic substitution
 Aromatic sulfonation
 Aromatic nitration

References 

Perchloryl compounds
Phenyl compounds